North Sterling State Park is a Colorado State Park located in Logan County north of Sterling, Colorado, Colorado. Warm water fish in the reservoir include walleye, wiper, bass, yellow perch, and channel catfish. Facilities include over 100 campsites, boat ramps, a swim beach and a visitors center.

References

State parks of Colorado
Sterling, Colorado
Protected areas of Logan County, Colorado
Protected areas established in 1992